Sorrento is a town in Southern Italy.

Sorrento may also refer to:

Places
Duchy of Sorrento, a principality of the Early Middle Ages centred on Sorrento, Italy
Sorrento, British Columbia, Canada
Sorrento, Florida, United States
Sorrento, Hong Kong
Sorrento, Louisiana, United States
Sorrento, Maine, United States
Sorrento, Victoria, a township in Victoria, Australia
Sorrento, Western Australia, suburb of Perth, Western Australia

Other uses
Sorrento Calcio, Italian football club
Sorrento FC, a Western Australian semi-professional soccer club
Sorrento Stakes, a thoroughbred horse race in Del Mar, California, United States
Kia Sorento, a crossover SUV produced by Kia
, a number of ships with this name
Paul Sorrento (born 1965), American baseball player
The Galbani brand of cheese and the Lactalis American Group, formerly Sorrento and Sorrento Lactalis

See also

Sorento (disambiguation)
Sorrento Valley, San Diego